State Road 241 in the U.S. state of Indiana is an 18-mile road that runs entirely within Knox County in the southwest corner of the state.

Route description
State Road 241 begins at U.S. Route 41 near Decker.  It runs north to the small town of Vollmer, then meanders to the northeast through Iona and Ridgeville until it reaches Monroe City, where it is concurrent with State Road 61 for about half a mile.  It then continues northeast for another four miles to U.S. Route 50/150 just southeast of Wheatland.

Major intersections

References

External links

 Indiana Highway Ends - SR 241

241
Transportation in Knox County, Indiana